Samuel J. Tedesco (February 21, 1915 – August 5, 2003) was an American politician who was the 96th Lieutenant Governor of Connecticut from 1963 to 1966.

Tedesco succeeded Jasper McLevy as mayor of Bridgeport, Connecticut in 1957.

References

1915 births
2003 deaths
American people of Italian descent
Connecticut Democrats
Lieutenant Governors of Connecticut
Mayors of Bridgeport, Connecticut
20th-century American politicians
Boston University alumni